Tangent is a hamlet in northern Alberta, Canada within Birch Hills County, located along Alberta Highway 740, approximately  northeast of Grande Prairie. It was named by surveyors due to the formation of a tangent (straight-section) in the rail track that ran from Edmonton to Dawson Creek.

History 
On June 18, 1928, John Yaremko chose to settle at the current location of the hamlet, later joined by Albert Purcha and his family. The spring of 1929 brought a large group of settlers under the recruitment of Father Josephat Hamelin. In May, a general store was built, and a post office erected in the winter of that same year. Natural gas was discovered in the 1950s, opening up a new industry alongside agriculture and animal husbandry.

Today, Tangent is an agricultural community made up of mostly Franco-Albertans descended from the settlers that followed Father Hamelin, Eastern European Canadians, and Anglo-Canadians.

Demographics 
Tangent recorded a population of 39 in the 1991 Census of Population conducted by Statistics Canada.

See also 
List of communities in Alberta
List of hamlets in Alberta

References 

Birch Hills County
Hamlets in Alberta